The 1997 Salford Reds season was the 101st season in the club's rugby league history and the first season in the Super League. Coached by Andy Gregory, the Salford Reds competed in Super League II and finished in 6th place. The club also reached the semi-finals of the Challenge Cup before being knocked out by St. Helens.

Table

Squad

References

External links
Salford Reds - Rugby League Project

Salford Red Devils seasons
Salford Reds